Clarence Gregory (27 October 1900 – 1975) was an English professional footballer who played as a winger for Sunderland.

References

1900 births
1975 deaths
Footballers from Birmingham, West Midlands
English footballers
Association football wingers
Telford United F.C. players
Sunderland A.F.C. players
Queens Park Rangers F.C. players
Yeovil Town F.C. players
Hereford United F.C. players
Leamington F.C. players
Rugby Town F.C. players
English Football League players